The Rondevlei Nature Reserve is located in Grassy Park, Zeekoevlei and Lavenderhill, suburbs of Cape Town, South Africa. The nature reserve is among the most important wetlands for birds in South Africa despite being situated directly alongside the Zeekoevlei. A number of islands on the vlei act as vital breeding sites. Rondevlei is home to about 230 bird species, a variety of small mammals and reptiles like caracal, porcupine, Cape fox, grysbuck, steenbuck and mongoose, as well as a hippopotamus population which was re-introduced in 1981 as a means to control an alien grass species from South America, which had covered the shoreline and was threatening to engulf the vlei itself. It boasts unusual and threatened ecosystems like strandveld, sand plains fynbos, Cape lowland wetland vegetation and indigenous coastal fynbos vegetation with unique plants found nowhere else in the world.

In February 2004, a young hippo  named Hugo or Houdini escaped from Rondevlei after it was bullied by an older dominant male and was on the run for 10 months until it was caught in December and moved to an Eastern Cape private reserve.

History
The reserve was established in 1952 in cooperation with the Cape Divisional Council (now Cape Metropolitan Council), when the area was still used by locals to graze horses and cattle, for woodcutting and flower picking. To prevent flooding of the built-up areas, which contained then mainly sub-economic housing, a dam at the south-eastern end of the vlei was built to permanently lower the level of Rondevlei. The management of the reserve was taken over by the South Peninsula Municipality in 1997 and it is now part of the City of Cape Town.

Facilities
Besides birdwatching visitors are offered guided tours, boat cruises, conference facilities and secluded overnight accommodation within the reserve which are organized by a community-based company, Imvubu Nature Tours, which was established in 2002 with the use of poverty relief funds, made available by the Department of Environmental Affairs and Tourism.

See also
 Boulders Beach
 Cape Flats Dune Strandveld
 Cape Flats Sand Fynbos
 Cape Lowland Freshwater Wetland
 Kirstenbosch National Botanical Garden

External links

False Bay Ecology Park web site
Friends of Zeekoeivlei and Rondevlei's web site
Press release about the introduction of 3 new hippos in 2003
Article in Cape Times about escaped hippo
Google map

 
Nature reserves in Cape Town
Protected areas of the Western Cape
Wetlands of South Africa